"Boom" is a song by American recording artist Anastacia, which served as the official song of the 2002 FIFA World Cup held in South Korea and Japan. Co-written with and produced by Glen Ballard, it was released as a single on June 3, 2002, by Daylight Records and Epic Records. The song was included on The Official Album of the 2002 FIFA World Cup, as well as on the collectors edition of Anastacia's second studio album Freak of Nature (2001).

In 2014, MTV Italy declared it the country's favorite FIFA World Cup song.

Music video
Directed by Marcos Siega, the music video for "Boom" was shot in London in 2002. It was later included on her first DVD, The Video Collection. In the beginning of the video, a car is driving along and the radio plays "One Day in Your Life" in the background. Suddenly the car stops and a light flash is seen in the sky. Then the song starts and Anastacia is performing it on a small stage in front of a crowd. During the video, several people get beamed up to this party, some of them being soccer players.

Track listings
 Australia
 "Boom" (Album Version) – 3:18
 "Boom" (M*A*S*H Radio Mix) – 3:04
 "Boom" (Thunderpuss Radio Mix) - 3:20
 "Boom" (M*A*S*H Master Mix) – 6:23
 "Boom" (Thunderpuss Club Mix) – 10:52

 Europe
 "Boom" (Album Version) – 3:18
 "Boom" (Almighty Radio Edit) – 4:03
 "Boom" (M*A*S*H Radio Mix) – 3:04
 "Boom" (Thunderpuss Club Mix) – 10:52
 "Boom" (Video)

 Austria
 "Boom" (Album Version) – 3:18
 "Boom" (Almighty Radio Edit) – 4:03

 Japan
 "Boom" (Album Version) – 3:18
 "Paid My Dues" (Album Version) – 3:22

Charts

Weekly charts

Year-end charts

Release history

References

2002 singles
2002 songs
Anastacia songs
Daylight Records singles
Epic Records singles
2002 FIFA World Cup
FIFA World Cup official songs and anthems
Music videos directed by Marcos Siega
Songs written by Anastacia
Songs written by Glen Ballard